In mathematics, the attractor of a random dynamical system may be loosely thought of as a set to which the system evolves after a long enough time. The basic idea is the same as for a deterministic dynamical system, but requires careful treatment because random dynamical systems are necessarily non-autonomous. This requires one to consider the notion of a pullback attractor or attractor in the pullback sense.

Set-up and motivation

Consider a random dynamical system  on a complete separable metric space , where the noise is chosen from a probability space  with base flow .

This definition is far too limited, especially in dimensions higher than one. A more plausible definition, modelled on the idea of an omega-limit set, would be to say that a point  lies in the attractor  if and only if there exists an initial condition, and there is a sequence of times  such that

This is not too far from a working definition. However, we have not yet considered the effect of the noise , which makes the system non-autonomous (i.e. it depends explicitly on time). That is, one is interested in the pullback limit

.

So, for example, in the pullback sense, the omega-limit set for a (possibly random) set  is the random set

Equivalently, this may be written as

Importantly, in the case of a deterministic dynamical system (one without noise), the pullback limit coincides with the deterministic forward limit, so it is meaningful to compare deterministic and random omega-limit sets, attractors, and so forth.

Several examples of pullback attractors of non-autonomous dynamical systems are presented analytically and numerically.

Definition

The pullback attractor (or random global attractor)  for a random dynamical system is a -almost surely unique random set such that

  is invariant: for all  almost surely;
  is attractive: for any deterministic bounded set ,
 almost surely.

There is a slight abuse of notation in the above: the first use of "dist" refers to the Hausdorff semi-distance from a point to a set,

whereas the second use of "dist" refers to the Hausdorff semi-distance between two sets,

As noted in the previous section, in the absence of noise, this definition of attractor coincides with the deterministic definition of the attractor as the minimal compact invariant set that attracts all bounded deterministic sets.

Theorems relating omega-limit sets to attractors

The attractor as a union of omega-limit sets

If a random dynamical system has a compact random absorbing set , then the random global attractor is given by

where the union is taken over all bounded sets .

Bounding the attractor within a deterministic set

then  -almost surely.

References

 Crauel, H., Debussche, A., & Flandoli, F. (1997) Random attractors. Journal of Dynamics and Differential Equations. 9(2) 307–341.
 Crauel, H. (1999) Global random attractors are uniquely determined by attracting deterministic compact sets. Ann. Mat. Pura Appl. 4 176 57–72
 Chekroun, M. D., E. Simonnet, and M. Ghil, (2011). Stochastic climate dynamics: Random attractors and time-dependent invariant measures. Physica D. 240 (21), 1685–1700.

Random dynamical systems